The Lai da Ravais-ch is an Alpine lake located south of the Sertig Pass and west of the Sella da Ravais-ch, in the Swiss canton of Graubünden. The lake has an area of 0.093 km² and is located at 2,505 metres above sea level. It is located in the municipality of Bergün Filisur.

The lake is also named Lai da Ravais-ch Suot to distinguish it from a smaller lake located east of the Sella da Ravais-ch and named Lai da Ravais-ch Sur.

See also
List of mountain lakes of Switzerland

References

Lakes of Graubünden
Lakes of Switzerland
Bergün Filisur